U Maung Maung Lwin (8 October 1919 – 28 March 1989) was a Burmese sailor. He competed at the 1956 Summer Olympics and the 1960 Summer Olympics.

References

External links
 

1919 births
1989 deaths
People from Bago Region
Burmese male sailors (sport)
Olympic sailors of Myanmar
Sailors at the 1956 Summer Olympics – Finn
Sailors at the 1960 Summer Olympics – Finn
Burmese emigrants to Australia